Mr. Funnybone is a 1976 Hong Kong comedy film directed by Kuei Chih-Hung based on the manhua, Old Master Q, by Alfonso Wong, who also co-wrote the script and serves as the film's co-producer, and starring Wang Sha as the titular protagonist. The film was followed by a sequel, Mr. Funnybone Strikes Again, released in 1978.

Cast
 Wang Sha as Mr. Funnybone / Old Master Q
 Liu Lu-hua as Mr. Chun
 Ai Tung-kwa as Big Potato
 Lee Ching as Miss Chan
 Chong Lee as Ms. Lam
 Ng Tin as Manager Chiu
 Jia Ling as Mrs. Chiu
 Norman Chu as Funnybone's colleague
 Leung Seung-wan as Funnybone's colleague
 Ngai Fei as Funnybone's colleague
 Lee Yuen-wah as Funnybone's colleague
 Lau Wai-ming as Funnybone's colleague
 Sharon Yeung as Lady exercising in the park
 Kong Yeung as Escaped convict
 Mak Wa-mei as Potato's girlfriend
 Lee Chung-ling
 Au Ka-lai
 Ching Si
 Wong Ching-ching
 Cheng Chok-chow as Funnybone's colleague
 Liu Wai as Mr Hiroshi
 Lui Hung as Mrs. Xing
 Tino Wong as Molester in the park
 Fung Ming as Man reading newspaper in the park
 Tsui On-sam as Funnybone's fat cousin
 Man Man as Restaurant customer
 Chiu Chun-chiu as Restaurant waiter
 Kam Tin-chue as Manager Chiu's friend
 Koo Chim-hung as Manager Chiu's friend
 Hung Ling-ling as Manager Chiu's girlfriend
 Cheung Sek-au as Alighting bus passenger
 Ting Tung as Wedding guest

External links
 
 IMDb entry
 Hong Kong Cinemagic entry

1976 films
1976 comedy films
Hong Kong comedy films
Hong Kong slapstick comedy films
Shaw Brothers Studio films
1970s Cantonese-language films
Films based on Hong Kong comics
Films set in Hong Kong
Films shot in Hong Kong
Live-action films based on comics
1970s Hong Kong films